az24saat.org is an English, Russian and Azerbaijani news website of Republic of Azerbaijan.

Overview

The web site "24saat.org" is a news site about political, economic, social and other actions in Azerbaijan. The founder of the website is Vugar Qurdqanli. The website provides 24 hours news in 3 different languages - Azerbaijani, English and Russian.

Website block

The site has been blocked in Azerbaijan since 2017 for political reasons. It is currently meeting with its readers under the domain name "az24saat.org".

The Electronic Security Service of the Ministry of Transport, Communication and High Technologies of the Republic of Azerbaijan filed a lawsuit with the Sabail District Court on 6 August 2018 for the restriction of access. They demanded that four articles bearing the (former) vice president of the president, Ali Hasanov, be deleted from the site within eight hours. Articles are currently on the website.

References

External links 
  (AZE)

 Azerbaijan News

Azerbaijani news websites